Abseiling, also known as rappelling, is the controlled descent of a steep slope, such as a rock face, by moving down a rope. When abseiling, the person descending controls their own movement down the rope, in contrast to lowering off, in which the rope attached to the person descending is paid out by their belayer.

Description
The technique is used by climbers, mountaineers, cavers, canyoners, search and rescue and rope access technicians to descend cliffs or slopes when they are too steep and/or dangerous to descend without protection. Many climbers use this technique to protect established anchors from damage. Rope access technicians also use this as a method to access difficult-to-reach areas from above for various industrial applications like maintenance, construction, inspection and welding.

To descend safely, abseilers use a variety of techniques to increase the friction on the rope to the point where it can be controlled comfortably. These techniques range from wrapping the rope around their body (e.g. the Dülfersitz technique) to using custom-built devices like a rack or a figure of 8. Practitioners choose a technique based on speed, safety, weight and other circumstantial concerns.

In the United States, the term "rappelling" is used. In the United Kingdom, both terms are understood, but "abseiling" is more common. In Australia, New Zealand and Canada, the two terms are used interchangeably. Globally, the term "rappelling" appears in books written in English more often than "abseiling".

History 
The origin of the term rappel in reference to the technique is attributed by  circa 1944. Charlet originally devised the technique during a failed solo attempt of Petit Dru in 1876. After many attempts, some of them solo, he managed to reach the summit of the Petit Dru in 1879 in the company of two other hired Chamonix guides, Prosper Payot and Frédéric Folliguet. During that ascent, Charlet mastered the technique.

Equipment 
 Ropes: Static rope is ideal, but often dynamic rope is used.
 Anchors: Usually constructed from trees, boulders, ice or rock features, using webbing/cordelette, or rock climbing equipment. Some areas have fixed anchors such as bolts or pitons.
 A descender: A friction device or friction hitch that allows rope to be played out in a controlled fashion, under load, with a minimal effort by the person controlling it.
 Climbing harness: Fixed around the waist or whole body used to secure the descender. Fit is important to prevent suspension trauma.
 Safety back-up: Typically a friction hitch such as a prusik, Klemheist knot, or autoblock knot wrapped around the rope as to prevent uncontrolled descents.
 Helmets: Used to protect the head from bumps and falling rocks.
 Gloves: Used to protect hands from the rope and from colliding with the wall. May increase the risk of accident by becoming caught in the descender.
 Boots or climbing shoes: Used to increase friction against the rock
 Knee-pads (and sometimes elbow-pads)

Application 

Abseiling is used in a number of applications, including:
 Climbing - for returning to the base of a climb or to a point where one can try a new route.
 Recreation
 Canyoning - to descend tall waterfalls and/or cliffs. 
 Mountaineering 
 Caving and speleology - where underground pitches need to be accessed.
 Adventure racing
 Industrial/commercial applications - to access parts of structures or buildings so as to perform maintenance, cleaning or construction, known as rope access.
 Access to wildfires.
 Confined spaces access - e.g. ballast tanks, manholes
 Rescue applications - used to access injured people on or nearby cliffs.
 Military applications - tactical heliborne insertion of troops, including special forces, into the battlefield close to the objective when proper landing zones are not available.

Styles/techniques 

 Australian rappel — Used in the military. The abseiler descends facing downwards allowing them to see where they are going.
 Tandem or spider abseiling — Used in climbing.  Involves two climbers descending on the same belay device. This is useful in rescue situations when one of the climbers is incapacitated or the descent needs to be done quickly. The set-up is similar to a regular rappelling, with the incapacitated climber suspended from the descender (and backed up on the primary climbers harness).
 Simul-rappelling or simultaneously rappelling — Used in climbing and canyoning.  Two climbers descend simultaneously on the same length of rope, where one climber’s weight counterbalances the other. Generally the technique is considered less safe than the regular rappelling; however, it is useful in case of emergencies, or for rapping off opposite sides of a fin or spire where there are no anchor points. This is common in places like the Needles of South Dakota’s Black Hills.
 Counterbalance abseiling — Used in climbing. This rescue technique is typically used by a leader to reach an injured second. The leader abseils off on one strand of rope, using the incapacitated second's weight on the other strand of the rope as a counterbalance.
 Releasable abseil — Used by guides. This safety technique allows a leader to descend with inexperienced abseilers. A rope about twice the length of the descent is anchored with a munter mule hitch. The client descends on a single isolated strand of the rope. If the client becomes stuck halfway down the guide will be able to unlock the other strand and lower the client to the ground using the hitch as a belay device. This could be useful if the client panics, or gets clothing or hair entangled in the descender.
 Classical (non-mechanical methods), e.g. the Dülfersitz — Used in emergencies. These technique are more dangerous than modern alternatives and only used when no other option is available. They involve descending without aid of mechanical devices, by wrapping the rope around the body, and were used before the advent of harnesses and hardware.
 South African classical abseil (double-roped) — Used in emergencies. This is a type of classical abseil where the user has a spare hand.
 Fireman's Belay — Safety backup. A partner stands on the ground below holding the rope(s). If the abseiler begins to fall they will be able to pull down on the rope to arrest the descent.

Safety 
Abseiling can be dangerous and presents risks, especially to unsupervised or inexperienced abseilers. According to German mountaineer Pit Schubert, about 25% of climbing deaths occur during abseiling, most commonly due to failing anchors. An analysis of American Alpine Club accident reports shows that this is followed by inadequate safety backups and rappelling off the ends of ropes.

Environmental concerns 
Abseiling is prohibited or discouraged in some areas, as it may cause environmental damage, conflict with climbers heading upwards, and/or endanger people on the ground.

See also
 List of climbing topics
 Canyoning
 Caving
 Mountaineering
 Search and rescue

References and footnotes

External links 

 BMC: Abseiling: Not the quickest way to reach the ground
 Abseiling: Information and instruction for charities to fundraise

Mountaineering techniques
Caving techniques
Climbing techniques